Horsham  is a market town on the upper reaches of the River Arun on the fringe of the Weald in West Sussex, England. Nearby towns include Crawley to the north-east and Haywards Heath and Burgess Hill to the south-east. It is the administrative centre of the Horsham district.

History

Governance
Horsham is the largest town in the Horsham District Council area. The second, higher, tier of local government is West Sussex County Council, based in Chichester. It lies within the ancient Norman administrative division of the Rape of Bramber and the Hundred of Singlecross in Sussex.

The town is the centre of the parliamentary constituency of Horsham, recreated in 1983.  Jeremy Quin has served as Conservative Member of Parliament for Horsham since 2015, succeeding Francis Maude, who held the seat from 1997 but retired at the 2015 general election.

Geography

Weather

Horsham holds the UK record for the heaviest hailstone ever to fall. On 5 September 1958, a hailstone weighing 140g (4.9 oz) landed in the town. It was similar in size to a tennis ball and impact speeds have been calculated to be 100 m/s (224 mph).

Topography 
It is in the centre of the Weald in the Low Weald, at the western edge of the High Weald, with the Surrey Hills of the North Downs to the north and the Sussex Downs of the South Downs National Park to the south. The River Arun rising from ghylls in the St Leonard's Forest area, to the east of Horsham, cuts through the south of the town then makes its way through Broadbridge Heath. The Arun is joined by a number of streams flowing down from the north, which rises around Rusper.

Town centre 
Horsham has grown up around the Carfax (an open pedestrianised square). To the south of the Carfax is the Causeway. This street consists of houses erected in the 17th, 18th, and early 19th century and is lined with ancient London Plane trees. The Horsham Museum is at the north end opposite to the recently developed former headquarters of the R.S.P.C.A. At the south end of the Causeway is the Church of England parish church of St. Mary: Norman in origin, rebuilt in the 13th century and restored in 1864–65 by the Gothic revival architect S.S. Teulon. The area immediately to the south of the parish church is known as Normandy. It was formerly an area of artisans cottages and an ancient well. Fifty metres south is the River Arun. On the northern bank is Prewett's Mill, and on the south side is the town's cricket field. A short walk along the banks of the Arun in a south-easterly direction is Chesworth Farm, an area of open public access.

To the north of the Carfax is a park, Horsham Park, the remnant of what was formerly the Hurst Park Estate. The park has football pitches, a wildlife pond and tennis courts. Leisure facilities, including a swimming complex and a gymnastic centre, have been built on land around the park.
The area consists of mainly Victorian and Edwardian houses to the north of Brighton Road, whilst to the south, there are areas of inter- and post-war housing. This area is known as the East Side.

Suburbs
Horsham has developed beyond the original boundaries to incorporate some of the smaller hamlets which now form part of the outer districts.

Holbrook 
An area of Horsham named after a feeder stream of the River Arun. It consists of residential housing, the majority of which is of late 20th-century origin. The suburb is substantial enough for two council wards. The hamlet around Old Holbrook House is immediately to the north of the A264, which abuts Holbrook. Holbrook House was previously the home of Sir William Vesey-Fitzgerald, Governor of Bombay and M.P. for Horsham (1852–1875). The Tithe Barn at Fivens Green is the most notable building in the district.

Littlehaven

This hamlet dates back to the late 18th century, when a small number of houses were in existence, with an inn opening in the early part of the 19th century. A station opened in the area in 1907, originally called Rusper Road Crossing halt, but later renamed .

Needles
South-west of the town, the Needles estate was laid out from c. 1955, with a mixture of privately owned and council-built houses and bungalows. The land around Hills Farm nearby was sold for development in 1972 and further development took place in the 1980s. The Needles are named after a local farmhouse, called so as it was built using timbers from ships wrecked on the Needles formation.

New Town
In keeping with many other towns, new developments to the east of the town centre were rapid in the early Victorian era, and that area of the town became known, as it is today, as New Town. The area contains the Iron Bridge, a steel structure that carries the railway to the south of Horsham.

North Heath
Originally used as a label to describe the northern part of the parish of Horsham (compared to Southwater to describe that part south of the River Arun), this area was developed as a district in the latter part of the 20th century.

Oakhill
This area was originally known as Grub Street, and developed south of Depot Road in the 19th century.

Roffey

Roffey is north east of the centre of Horsham and as a hamlet dates back to at least the 13th century, with taxation records of 1296 showing 18 liable people in the area. Kelley's Post Office Directory for 1867 describes 'Roughey' as consisting 'of a few farmhouses and cottages. Here is an iron church, capable of accommodating 80 persons'. Maps of the 1880s show Roffey Corner (still spelt Roughey), but appear to label the hamlet as Star Row, with Roffey in use again by the start of the 20th century. A railway station opened as Roffey Road Halt in 1907, closing in 1937. The station is shown in the location now known as Wimland Road. Roffey is a separate ecclesiastical parish with its own parish church—All Saints' Church on Crawley Road, designed in 1878 by Arthur Blomfield. It replaced a temporary building which was licensed for worship in 1856. Roffey Park Institute is based just outside of Horsham, near Colgate.

Tower Hill
Tower Hill is a hamlet that lies one mile south from Horsham on a ridge of land containing a sandstone known as Horsham Stone rising above the town. A quarry existed here from 1830 to 1876. Tower Hill consists of housing dating from medieval to late 20th century. It has a public house called the Boar's Head, formerly the Fox and Hounds. The economic importance of quarrying Horsham Stone to Horsham in the 19th century has left a legacy of toponyms including Stone Pit Field, Stone Barn, Stonyhurst and Stone Pit Wood.

Trafalgar
An area of late 19th and early 20th centuries development on land west of the London Road at North Parade. It consists chiefly of semi-detached houses with corner shops, most of which have closed. Until the mid-20th century, it was known as "The Common," after a piece of common land that survived enclosure in Trafalgar Road for many years. Trafalgar forms one of the wards of Horsham Hurst (electoral division) of the Horsham District Council.

Economy 
Horsham is a market town formerly trading in cattle, sheep, and corn. Its prosperity was built on industries that included brewing, brickmaking, iron-smelting, and printing. Although some of these survive, with the exception of iron smelting, they are on a small scale and no longer employ large numbers of workers. In 2014 the important industries were financial services, pharmaceuticals, and technology. Horsham is a commuter town serving London, Gatwick Airport and the South East Coast.

RSA Insurance Group, an insurance company, has its registered office in Horsham. Sun Alliance merged with Royal Insurance in 1996 to form Royal & Sun Alliance Insurance Group, then renamed RSA Insurance Group in 2008. The company first came to the town in 1965 as Sun Alliance, becoming the town's biggest employer, at its peak, it employed 2,500 people, plus the specialised computer centre called Lennox Wood, sited in Southwater country park to which many of the original Horsham computer department staff were relocated. At its peak, the company occupied several smaller premises on the Carfax, Springfield House near St John the Evangelist Roman Catholic Church, the building that is now a study centre in Hurst Road, Parkside and the whole of the St Mark's complex, and print and security centres in industrial estates sprinkled around Horsham, plus Tricourt House closer to the Carfax and now occupied by a housing association. West Sussex County Council has partially occupied parkside after Royal Sun Alliance vacated the building.

Until 2015 the Swiss-based multinational pharmaceutical company Novartis, formerly Ciba-Geigy before a 1996 merger, was a major employer in the town, but the plant is now closed and the site scheduled for redevelopment.

The RSPCA, an animal welfare charity, has a £16 million headquarters at Southwater near Horsham, built to replace its former headquarters in the centre of the town.

Horsham's town centre has many national chain stores, and although it has suffered the loss of some small and independent retailers, the town retains its reputation for individuality and attracts shoppers from a wide area.
In 1992 the town centre was redesigned to reduce significantly the flow of traffic through the town's main shopping streets, and West Street was pedestrianised by 1977. Much of the Carfax, which once consisted of two concentric rings of roads, was pedestrianised to create a new town square. The underground toilets that once served the Carfax are now underneath the war memorial. The bandstand was moved to its present site from the south corner of the Carfax. The Victorian drinking fountain now at the southern end of North Street originally stood on the Carfax.

On the northwest side of the Carfax is Swan Walk, a shopping centre which opened in 1976 and was enclosed with a glass roof in 1989 with the addition of Springfield Court. Swan Walk takes its name from the Swan Inn that once stood where the pedestrian area now enters West Street, the old name being honoured by the bronze swan statues to the back of the mall and a mosaic in the centre. The shopping centre once enclosed the Capital Theatre which was built in the 1930s and was sandwiched between shops and a multi-storey car park from 1976 until its demolition in early 1983 when Marks & Spencer bought the site to build their store that opened in 1984. A further shopping area and public square, the Forum, opened in 2003 to the south of West Street. There is a newly refurbished and partially rebuilt shopping and leisure area known as Piries Place to the South East of the Carfax and North of East Street. It features the town's second Premier Inn, an Everyman Cinema, bars and restaurants, plus independent shops. East Street, formerly part of the main throughway through the town, was pedestrianised in 2009.

Supermarkets serving the town include branches of Tesco, Sainsbury's, Marks & Spencer, Lidl and Waitrose. In 2015, a new £8 million "Waitrose" and "John Lewis at Home" joint facility was opened after the closure of the smaller Waitrose that was formerly located in Piries Place.

Landmarks

In the commercial centre of Horsham is an open pedestrianised square known as the Carfax. This area contains the Town's Memorial to the dead of the two world wars, a substantial, well-used bandstand and is the venue for Saturday and Thursday markets. The name Carfax is likely of Norman origin – a corruption of 'Quatre Voies' (four ways) or 'Carrefour', a place where four roads meet. The Carfax was formerly known as "Scarfoulkes", the derivation of which is uncertain. Two other places in England share the name: the Carfax in Oxford and the Carfax in Winchester.  

At the west end of the town centre formerly stood a kinetic water sculpture called the 'Rising Universe', colloquially known as 'The Shelley Fountain'. It was designed by Angela Conner, and erected to commemorate the poet Percy Bysshe Shelley who was born at Field Place in Broadbridge Heath, near Warnham, two miles west from Horsham centre. The fountain was designed to release a torrent of six and a half tons of water periodically; it was 45 ft across at its base, standing 28 ft high. It carried a plaque bearing one of his poems 'Mont Blanc'.

The fountain was turned off in the spring of 2006 to save water. Despite recycling it used 180 gallons a day to cover evaporation and filtration losses. However, the council has made water saving efficiencies elsewhere and the fountain was turned on again on 13 November 2006, its tenth birthday but was turned off again after that Christmas. In May 2008 the fountain was turned off again due to the failure of its main hydraulic cylinder. On 19 January 2009 the fountain was fenced off for repairs. It was reopened without the fountain functioning. The fountain was again repaired at the start of March 2011 at a cost of more than £30,000 and was removed altogether in June 2016  with cost of upkeep being cited as the main reason.

The Parish Church of St. Mary the Virgin is the oldest building in Horsham, having been in continuous use for nearly eight centuries. It is located at the end of the Causeway in Normandy, the oldest existing part of Horsham. It has a ring of ten bells.

The earthworks of the eleventh century Horsham or Chennelsbrook Castle can be found near Chennells Brook.

The Town Hall in the Market Square is a much-adapted building originally dating from circa 1648 when it was referred to as a 'Market House'. In 1721 a new construction of Portland Stone was built containing a poultry and butter market. The building fell into disrepair and was substantially rebuilt around 1812. In 1888 it became the property of Horsham Urban District Council and was again largely rebuilt. The present building is essential of late-Victorian construction, though preserving some aspects of the earlier buildings. It has been used as council offices and as a magistrates court and more recently housed the Horsham Registry Office on the upper floor. The ground floor was still used as an occasional market place until the Town Hall was closed to be let as a restaurant.

Transport

Road
Horsham lies at the junction of three main routes with the dual carriageway A24 running north to south route from London and Dorking to Worthing. The A264 links Horsham to Crawley and the M23 to the east by a modern dual carriageway and to the A29 to the west. The A281 runs between Guildford and Brighton.

Bus services are provided by Metrobus, Stagecoach South, Arriva Southern Counties and Compass Travel.

Railway
The railway station is on the Arun Valley Line from Chichester to Crawley, Gatwick and London Victoria. Trains on this line start from Bognor Regis or Portsmouth and Southampton Central, and are coupled at Horsham. Southbound trains divide here. Other services (stopping during the off-peak period) leave Horsham for London Bridge. Sutton & Mole Valley line services go north to Dorking, Epsom, Sutton and London Victoria. In 2012, work finished expanding and modernising the station.  Littlehaven station (previously named Littlehaven Halt), in the northeast of the town on the Arun Valley Line , and Christ's Hospital station serving the west of Horsham.

Air

Other
Cyclists, pedestrians, and horseriders can reach Guildford and Shoreham via the Downs Link, a long-distance bridleway and cycle route which follows the now disused Horsham-Guildford, and Horsham-Shoreham railway lines and passes through Southwater, just to the south of Horsham.

Education
The main secondary schools in Horsham are:
 Tanbridge House School (mixed comprehensive)
 Millais School (girls' comprehensive)
 The Forest School (mixed' comprehensive)
 Bohunt Horsham (mixed comprehensive)

The College of Richard Collyer is the sixth form college serving Horsham. Founded in 1532, it is known more commonly as "Collyer's", and is situated on Hurst Road.

As of July 2020, West Sussex County Council announced proposals to alter The Forest School from a single sex boys’ school to a co-educational school from September 2021 entry.

Horsham is home to the following well known independent schools:

 Christ's Hospital, one of the oldest schools in the country, established in 1552 by Edward VI. An independent co-educational 11–18 boarding and day school
 Farlington School, an independent day and boarding school for children aged 4–18 at Strood Green about three miles from Horsham travelling towards Rudgwick. Originally founded as a girls' school, from 2020, Farlington will be accepting boys as well as girls into certain year groups.

Sports

Cricket
Horsham Cricket Club play their home matches at Cricketfield Road, which used to be used twice a season by Sussex County Cricket Club for matches. Although cricket was played in Horsham before 1768, the first recorded game of a town side was on 8 August 1771, which is when Horsham Cricket Club was created. The Club has played various locations over the years, before settling at the present ground in 1851. Horsham Cricket Club were national champions in 2005.  Current England international Jofra Archer is a notable recent alumnus. Founded in 1921, Horsham Trinity Cricket Club play at the Victory Road recreation ground (Trafalgar), with the 1st XI playing in Division 4 West of the Central Sussex Cricket League as of the 2022 season.

Football

Horsham F.C. is the town's senior football club and currently (2022–23) play in the Isthmian League Premier Division. They have had sporadic success through their history, reaching the final of the Sussex Senior Cup in 2007, winning the Isthmian League Cup in 2022 and the first round proper of the FA Cup on four occasions. They reached the 2nd round in 2007-08, losing in a replay to Swansea City and the first round in 2021, losing away at Carlisle United. The team currently play at the Hop Oast Stadium (known for sponsorship purposes as the Camping World Community Stadium), after it was opened in June 2019.  This followed a period of homelessness after their  Queen Street stadium was demolished in 2008.

Horsham YMCA F.C., founded in 1898, currently play in the Premier Division of the Southern Combination Football League in 2022/23. They are nicknamed 'The YMs', and play their home games at Gorings Mead in the Iron Bridge part of Horsham.

Roffey F.C. were promoted to the Southern Combination Football League Premier Division for the first time ever in 2021/22. They play at Bartholomew Way in Roffey in the north of Horsham.

Rugby

Horsham RUFC who play at the Coolhurst Ground, are the town's premier Rugby Union team. They were founded in 1928 with their first headquarters at the Station Hotel opposite Horsham Station. Initially, the team played on farmland adjacent to the Warnham Park Estate, but from 1930 until 1968, they were settled at Horsham Cricket Club. The club grew considerably after the war with further pitches rented in Horsham Park. In 1972 they moved to their present home. At the end of the 2018-19 season, Horsham 1st XV was promoted to London 1 South, the highest level the club has ever achieved. Following the restructure of the leagues Horsham will play in Regional 2 South East in the 2022/23 season. Horsham RUFC runs teams at every level starting with u7s Horsham Rugby Club

Holbrook RUFC is a smaller rugby club, based at The Holbrook Club in north Horsham. It was formed in 1971 as Sunallon RFC, which was the name of the Sun Alliance Sports & Social Club. This developed into Sun Alliance RFC and following a merger with the Liverpool-based Royal Insurance in 1996, into Royal & Sun Alliance RFC (RSA). Holbrook RFC now have two teams as of the 2014 season, with the 1sts in Sussex League 1, and 2nds in Sussex League 3.

Other sports

Horsham Hockey Club who play their home matches at Broadbridge Heath Leisure Centre.

Horsham Gymnastic Club have produced top female gymnasts a number of whom have progressed to the England and Great Britain national squads.

London 2012 Olympic Games

In the weeks preceding the London 2012 Olympic Games, the Grenadian Olympic Team trained at Broadbridge Heath Leisure Centre, which is on the outskirts of the town.

Public services

Horsham Hospital, is open weekdays, and is located on Hurst Road. The town has its own law courts, ambulance station, fire station, and police station, also located on Hurst Road. The Statutory emergency fire and rescue service is provided by the West Sussex Fire and Rescue Service. The territorial police force for Horsham and surrounding areas is Sussex Police.

The Registry of births, deaths, and marriages is located in Park House, North Street in central Horsham.

Community facilities 

Horsham Park immediately to the north of central Horsham is 24 hectares of open space for the use of the people of Horsham. It contains an 18th-century country house used in part by the Horsham District Council, formal gardens, and a maze. At the eastern side is The Pavilions in the Park leisure centre with a gym and a 25m swimming pool run by a private company for Horsham District Council. A BMX and Skate park is located on the Hurst Road side of Horsham Park. The remaining space is used extensively for leisure pursuits such as tennis, football and rugby.

Horsham Museum is located on the Causeway in a half-timbered medieval house. It has local history objects displayed in twenty-six galleries. Situated on North Street is The Capitol Theatre, Horsham, the venue (formerly Horsham Arts Centre) features a theatre, 2 cinema screens, a studio and gallery. On Lower Tanbridge Way is a two storey modernised library run by West Sussex County Council.

Cultural references 
The first illustrated history of Horsham was written in 1836 by Howard Dudley at the age of 16. It includes descriptions of St Mary's Church and other buildings along with lithographs and wood-cut images of the town. The book entitled The History and Antiquities of Horsham has been reproduced in full to enable research online.

Sir Arthur Conan Doyle had the fictitious Openshaw family, in the Sherlock Holmes story The Five Orange Pips, residing in the town.

Notable deceased residents

Notable living residents

 Carl Donnelly – comedian
 Mark Hawkins – Great Britain Handball player, represented Team GB at 2012 Summer Olympics
 Jamie Hewlett – Artist/cartoonist and creator of the comic strip Tank Girl (made into a film in 1995) and co-creator of the band Gorillaz (nominated for five Grammy Awards in December 2005). He attended both Tanbridge House School and the former Northbrook Art College
 Alan Mullery – Former footballer with Fulham and Tottenham Hotspur, former manager of Crystal Palace and Brighton and Hove Albion
 Chris Nash – Nottinghamshire CCC cricketer
 Simon Nye – Writer of Men Behaving Badly, attended Collyer's when it was still a grammar school
 Jolyon Palmer – Former British Formula One driver for Renault Sport
 Paul Parker – England and Sussex CCC cricketer (captain); attended Collyer's School
David Sedaris – Novelist/comedian
 Chris Simms – Crime thriller writer who was born in Horsham
 Jamie Taylor – Footballer whose former clubs include Dagenham and Redbridge FC and Lincoln City
 Michael Thornely – Leicestershire CCC cricketer
 Holly Willoughby – TV presenter and model attended Collyer's Sixth Form College
 The Feeling – A pop band
Joshua Powell – Conservation biologist and #WWFVoices series host for World Wildlife Fund

Comments 

In October 2006, Horsham was pronounced the second best place to live in the UK, only beaten by Winchester. This was claimed by a Channel 4 show, The 10 best and worst places to live in the UK.

The programme mentioned that:

 Horsham was in the top 15% for low crime;
 About 70% of students gained 5 A* to C grades at GCSE;
 Over 85% of the workforce is economically active;
 Horsham has a high life expectancy of 76 years for men and 83 for women;
 There were two official homeless people living in Horsham.

In 2007, a Reader's Digest poll put Horsham as the 25th best place in mainland Britain to bring up a family.

On 27 September 2007, Horsham was awarded as the overall winner of Britain in Bloom in the large town / small city category a Gold Award. It also has the honour of being presented with the Royal Horticultural Society's 'Bloomin' Wild' award, which reflected the theme for year's national judging.

Horsham is placed number 27 in the book Crap Towns: The 50 Worst Places To Live In The UK. The satirical book describes Horsham as "a No Fun Zone run by new conservatives for old conservatives."

Twinning
Horsham District twinnings:
  St Maixent L'Ecole, Poitou-Charentes, France
  Lage, North Rhine-Westphalia, Germany
Horsham Town twinnings:
  Lerici, Liguria, Italy
  Horsham, Victoria, Australia

References

External links

 Horsham District Council – Local Government website

 

 
Towns in West Sussex
Market towns in West Sussex
Unparished areas in West Sussex